Talvar (also Romanized as Ţālvār, Tālevār, and Tālvār) is a village in Band-e Zarak Rural District, in the Central District of Minab County, Hormozgan Province, Iran. At the 2006 census, its population was 271, in 49 families.

References 

Populated places in Minab County